The Women's 20 kilometres walk event at the 2011 European Athletics U23 Championships was held in Ostrava, Czech Republic, at Městský stadion on 17 July.

Medalists

Results

Final
17 July 2011 / 10:00

†: Tatyana Mineyeva ranked initially 1st (1:31:42), but was disqualified later for infringement of IAAF doping rules.

Intermediate times:
2 km: 10:21 Alexandra Gradinariu 
4 km: 19:48 Tatyana Mineyeva 
6 km: 28:55 Nina Okhotnikova 
8 km: 37:48 Nina Okhotnikova 
10 km: 46:42 Nina Okhotnikova 
12 km: 55:31 Nina Okhotnikova 
14 km: 1:04:30 Nina Okhotnikova 
16 km: 1:13:32 Tatyana Mineyeva 
18 km: 1:22:25 Tatyana Mineyeva

Participation
According to an unofficial count, 20 athletes from 12 countries participated in the event.

References

20 kilometres walk
Racewalking at the European Athletics U23 Championships
2011 in women's athletics